Stoke Abbott is a village and civil parish in west Dorset, England,  west of Beaminster. In 2013 the estimated population of the parish was 190.

The author Ralph Wightman, agriculturist, broadcaster, and native of Dorset, described the village as "a beautiful place of deep lanes, orchards and old houses, with a church of quiet charm", and, in a similar vein, Sir Frederick Treves in 1906 considered it "as pretty a village as any in Dorset".

Mid-1st-century Roman and Romano-British military artefacts were found on the hill's southern slopes in 1876–8. In the Domesday Book in 1086 the village was recorded as Stoche and had 32 households.

The parish church of St Mary the Virgin has Norman origins but has been altered and added to over the centuries. The 12th-century font is notable. The poet William Crowe was rector here between 1782 and 1786; at the end of his incumbency he published his most well known piece, Lewesdon Hill, about the hill to the west of the village. The Very Rev Hedley Robert Burrows (1887 - 1983), who later became Archdeacon of Winchester and then Dean of Hereford, was incumbent at Stoke Abbott for a time.

References

External links

Villages in Dorset